Seacliff is an unincorporated community in Baldwin County, Alabama, United States.

History
A post office operated under the name Seacliff from 1913 to 1920.

References

Unincorporated communities in Baldwin County, Alabama
Unincorporated communities in Alabama